Parc-Seymour is a suburban hamlet on the northern edge of Penhow just off the A48 road.

Villages in Newport, Wales